2K Los Angeles (formerly Kush Games, Inc.) was an American video game developer based in Camarillo, California. Founded by Umrao Mayer in 1998, the company was part of Visual Concepts, which itself was a part of Sega. Both Kush Games and Visual Concepts were sold to Take-Two Interactive and subsequently became part of their new 2K label. Kush Games was renamed 2K Los Angeles in February 2007 before being shut down in 2008.

History 
Kush Games was founded by Umrao Mayer in 1998 to develop sports games. Kush Games was acquired by Sega in 2004 and became part of Visual Concepts. On January 24, 2005, Visual Concepts and Kush Games were acquired by Take-Two Interactive for  million. A total of  million had been paid to Sega for the acquisition of Visual Concepts and affiliated properties by January 2006. On January 25, 2005, the day following the acquisition, Take-Two Interactive announced their new publishing label, 2K, which would henceforth manage Visual Concepts and Kush Games.

In February 2007, Kush Games was rebranded 2K Los Angeles. By August 2007, Mayer had been succeeded as president by Graeme Bayless. Mayer, together with partner George Simmons, went on to found Zindagi Games in 2008. 2K Los Angeles was shut down that same year.

Games developed

References 

1998 establishments in California
2008 disestablishments in California
2K (company)
Defunct companies based in Greater Los Angeles
Defunct video game companies of the United States
Take-Two Interactive divisions and subsidiaries
Video game companies based in California
Video game companies disestablished in 2008
Video game companies established in 1998
Video game development companies